Macrocheilus nigrotibialis is a species of ground beetle in the subfamily Anthiinae. It was described by Heller in the year 1900.

References

Anthiinae (beetle)
Beetles described in 1900